Aransa, opened in 1986, is a Catalan ski resort located in Arànser, municipality of Lles de Cerdanya.

Green circuit: 5 km
Blue circuit: 7.5 km
Red circuit: 10 km
Black circuit: 5 km
Ride circuit: 8 km

The red circuit, El Mirador, reaches the highest point with an excellent view on the comarques of Alt Urgell and Cerdanya and over the Cadí Range.

External links 
Official website

Ski areas and resorts in Catalonia